Patrik Christoffer Källqvist (born 26 August 1983) is a former Swedish professional football goalkeeper. He was a one-club man and spent his entire career at BK Häcken.

Club career
During the 2018 Allsvenskan season, Källqvist announced his decision to retire from elite football at the end of the season. He underwent hip surgery in 2015, and has only played 5 Allsvenskan games for Häcken since then.

In his youth, Christoffer had a couple of trials with a various number of teams in England. Such as, Charlton Athletic and Ipswich Town. He currently plays his last season for BK Häcken and appears on the bench for BK Häcken in every game.

International career 
Källqvist represented the Sweden U17, U19, and U21 teams a total of 41 times between the years 1998 and 2005.

Honours

BK Häcken
Svenska Cupen: 2015–16

References

External links 
  
 

1983 births
Living people
Footballers from Gothenburg
Allsvenskan players
Superettan players
BK Häcken players
Swedish footballers
Sweden youth international footballers
Association football goalkeepers